A radar display is an electronic device to present radar data to the operator. The radar system transmits pulses or continuous waves of electromagnetic radiation, a small portion of which backscatter off targets (intended or otherwise) and return to the radar system. The receiver converts all received electromagnetic radiation into a continuous electronic analog signal of varying (or oscillating) voltage that can be converted then to a screen display.

Modern systems typically use some sort of raster scan display to produce a map-like image. Early in radar development, however, numerous circumstances made such displays difficult to produce. People ultimately developed several different display types.

Oscilloscopes

Early radar displays used adapted oscilloscopes with various inputs. An oscilloscope generally receives three channels of varying (or oscillating) voltage as input and displays this information on a cathode ray tube. The oscilloscope amplifies the input voltages and sends them into two deflection magnets and to the electron gun producing a spot on the screen. One magnet displaces the spot horizontally, the other vertically, and the input to the gun increases or decreases the brightness of the spot. A bias voltage source for each of the three channels allows the operator to set a zero point.

In a radar display, the output signal from the radar receiver is fed into one of three input channels in the oscilloscope. Early displays generally sent this information to either X channel or Y channel to displace the spot on the screen to indicate a return. More modern radars typically used a rotating or otherwise moving antenna to cover a greater area of the sky, and in these cases, electronics, slaved to the mechanical motion of the antenna, typically moved the X and Y channels, with the radar signal being fed into the brightness channel.

A-Scope

The original radar display, the A-scope or A-display, shows only the range, not the direction, to targets. These are sometimes referred to as R-scopes for range scope. A-scopes were used on the earliest radar systems during World War II, notably the seminal Chain Home (CH) system.

The primary input to the A-scope was the amplified return signal received from the radar, which was sent into the Y-axis of the display. Returns caused the spot to be deflected downward (or upward on some models), drawing vertical lines on the tube. These lines were known as a "blip" (or "pip"). The X-axis input was connected to a sawtooth voltage generator known as a time base generator that swept the spot across the display, timed to match the pulse repetition frequency of the radar. This spread out the blips across the display according to the time they were received. Since the return time of the signal corresponds to twice the distance to the target divided by the speed of light, the distance along the axis directly indicates the range to any target. This was usually measured against a scale above the display.

Chain Home signals were normally received on a pair of antennas arranged at right angles. Using a device known as a radiogoniometer, the operator could determine the bearing of the target, and by combining their range measurement with the bearing, they could determine a target's location in space. The system also had a second set of antennas, displaced vertically along the receiver towers. By selecting a pair of these antennas at different heights and connecting them to the radiogoniometer, they could determine the vertical angle of the target, and thus estimate its altitude. Since the system could measure both range and altitude, it was sometimes known as an HR-scope, from "height-range".

Early American, Dutch and German radars used the J-scope, which resembled a circular version of the A-scope. These display range as an angle around the display face, as opposed to the linear distance along it. This arrangement allows greater accuracy in reading the range with the same sized display as an A-scope because the trace uses the full circumference rather than just the horizontal distance (so the time base is π times longer). An electro-mechanical version of the J-scope display remained common on consumer boating depth meters until the 1990s.

To improve the accuracy of angle measurements, the concept of lobe switching became common in early radars. In this system, two antennas are used, pointed slightly left and right, or above and below, the boresight of the system. The received signal would differ in strength depending on which of the two antennas was more closely pointed at the target, and be equal when the antenna was properly aligned. To display this, both antennas were connected to a mechanical switch that rapidly switched between the two, producing two blips in the display. In order to differentiate them, one of the two receivers had a delay so it would appear slightly to the right of the other. The operator would then swing the antenna back and forth until both blips were the same height. This was sometimes known as a K-scope.

A slightly modified version of the K-scope was commonly used for air-to-air and ground-search radars, notably in AI radars and ASV radars - (Air-Surface Vessel). In these systems, the K-scope was turned 90 degrees so longer distances were further up the scope instead of further to the right. The output of one of the two antennas was sent through an inverter instead of a delay. The result was that the two blips were displaced on either side of the vertical baseline, both at the same indicated range. This allowed the operator to instantly see which direction to turn; if the blip on the right was shorter, they needed to turn to the right. These types of displays were sometimes referred to as ASV-scopes or L-scopes, although the naming was not universal.

Size of A-scope displays vary, but 5 to 7 inch diagonal was often used on a radar display. The 7JPx series of CRTs (7JP1, 7JP4 and 7JP7) was originally designed as an A-scope display CRT.

B-Scope

A B-scope or b-scan provides a 2-D "top down" representation of space, with the vertical axis typically representing range and the horizontal axis azimuth (angle). The B-scope's display represented a horizontal "slice" of the airspace on both sides of the aircraft out to the tracking angles of the radar. B-scope displays were common in airborne radars in the 1950s and 60s, which were mechanically scanned from side to side, and sometimes up and down as well.

The spot was swept up the Y-axis in a fashion similar to the A-scope's X-axis, with distances "up" the display indicating greater range. This signal was mixed with a varying voltage being generated by a mechanical device that depended on the current horizontal angle of the antenna. The result was essentially an A-scope whose range line axis rotated back and forth about a zero point at the bottom of the display. The radio signal was sent into the intensity channel, producing a bright spot on the display indicating returns.

An E-scope is essentially a B-scope displaying range vs. elevation, rather than range vs. azimuth. They are identical in operation to the B-scope, the name simply indicating "elevation". E-scopes are typically used with height finding radars, which are similar to airborne radars but turned to scan vertically instead of horizontally, they are also sometimes referred to as "nodding radars" due to their antenna's motion. The display tube was generally rotated 90 degrees to put the elevation axis vertical in order to provide a more obvious correlation between the display and the "real world". These displays are also referred to as a Range-Height Indicator, or RHI, but were also commonly referred to (confusingly) as a B-scope as well.

The H-scope is another modification of the B-scope concept, but displays elevation as well as azimuth and range. The elevation information is displayed by drawing a second "blip" offset from the target indicator by a short distance, the slope of the line between the two blips indicates the elevation relative to the radar. For instance, if the blip were displaced directly to the right this would indicate that the target is at the same elevation as the radar. The offset is created by dividing the radio signal into two, then slightly delaying one of the signals so it appears offset on the display. The angle was adjusted by delaying the time of the signal via a delay, the length of the delay being controlled by a voltage varying with the vertical position of the antenna. This sort of elevation display could be added to almost any of the other displays, and was often referred to as a "double dot" display.

C-Scope

A C-scope displays a "bullseye" view of azimuth vs. elevation. The "blip" was displayed indicating the direction of the target off the centreline axis of the radar, or more commonly, the aircraft or gun it was attached to. They were also known as "moving spot indicators" or "flying spot indicators" in the UK, the moving spot being the target blip. Range is typically displayed separately in these cases, often using a second display as an L-scope.

Almost identical to the C-scope is the G-scope, which overlays a graphical representation of the range to the target. This is typically represented by a horizontal line that "grows" out from the target indicator blip to form a wing-like shape. The wings grew in length at shorter distances to indicate the target was closer, as does the aircraft's wings when seen visually. A "shoot now" range indicator is often supplied as well, typically consisting of two short vertical lines centered on either side of the middle of the display. To make an interception, the pilot guides his aircraft until the blip is centered, then approaches until the "wings" fill the area between the range markers. This display recreated a system commonly used on gunsights, where the pilot would dial in a target's wingspan and then fire when the wings filled the area inside a circle in their sight. This system allowed the pilot to estimate the range to the target. In this case, however, the range is being measured directly by the radar, and the display was mimicking the optical system to retain commonality between the two systems.

Plan position indicator

The PPI display provides a 2-D "all round" display of the airspace around a radar site. The distance out from the center of the display indicates range, and the angle around the display is the azimuth to the target. The current position of the radar antenna is typically indicated by a line extending from the center to the outside of the display, which rotates along with the antenna in realtime. It is essentially a B-scope extended to 360 degrees. The PPI display is typically what people think of as a radar display in general, and was widely used in air traffic control until the introduction of raster displays in the 1990s.

PPI displays are actually quite similar to A-scopes in operation, and appeared fairly quickly after the introduction of radar. As with most 2D radar displays, the output of the radio receiver was attached to the intensity channel to produce a bright dot indicating returns. In the A-scope a sawtooth voltage generator attached to the X-axis moves the spot across the screen, whereas in the PPI the output of two such generators is used to rotate the line around the screen. Some early systems were mechanical, using a rotating deflection coil around the neck of the display tube, but the electronics needed to do this using a pair of stationary deflection coils were not particularly complex, and were in use in the early 1940s.

Beta Scan Scope

The specialist Beta Scan Scope was used for precision approach radar systems. It displays two lines on the same display, the upper one (typically) displaying the vertical approach (the glideslope), and the lower one the horizontal approach. A marker indicates the desired touchdown point on the runway, and often the lines are angled towards the middle of the screen to indicate this location. A single aircraft's "blip" is also displayed, superimposed over both lines, the signals being generated from separate antennas. Deviation from the centerline of the approach can be seen and easily relayed to the pilot.

In the image, the upper portion of the display shows the vertical situation, and the lower portion the horizontal. In the vertical, the two diagonal lines show the desired glideslope (upper) and minimum altitude approach (lower). The aircraft began its approach below the glideslope and captured it just before landing. The proper landing point is shown by the horizontal line at the left end. The lower display shows the aircraft starting to the left of the approach line and then being guided toward it.

References

Further reading

External links
 

Radar
Display devices